Holland Patent station is a historic train station located at Holland Patent in Oneida County, New York. It was built in 1890 and is a one-story, rectangular, wood-frame building sheathed in board-and-batten siding.  It was built by the Utica and Black River Railroad, later acquired by New York Central.  It was used until 1960 and now the line is used by the Adirondack Scenic Railroad.

The building was listed on the National Register of Historic Places in 2000 as Holland Patent Railroad Station, and according to a plaque on the building exterior, was renovated in 2003.

References

External links

Railway stations on the National Register of Historic Places in New York (state)
Transportation buildings and structures in Oneida County, New York
Railway stations in the United States opened in 1890
Former New York Central Railroad stations
National Register of Historic Places in Oneida County, New York